Arnao Esterlin (1593) was a Flemish conquistador in service of the Spanish crown. He took part in the appointment of Captain Domingo Martínez de Irala as lieutenant governor of Asuncion.

Esterlin was born in Flanders, the son of Cristóbal Esterlin (Osterling) and Ana Bersthin, natives of Germany. He arrival at Río de la Plata as a gunner in the expedition of Pedro de Mendoza. 

Arnao Esterlin had three natural children with a Guaraní woman, native of Asunción. His son Rodrigo de Esterlín, was married to Juana Solorzano, the daughter of Zoilo de Solorzano, a conqueror born in Biscay.

References

External links 
openedition.org

16th-century explorers
Explorers of Argentina
Flemish diaspora
Río de la Plata